Thirst (literally "bat") is a 2009 horror film written, produced and directed by Park Chan-wook. Loosely based on the 1867 novel Thérèse Raquin by Émile Zola, the film stars Song Kang-ho as Sang-hyun, a Catholic priest who turns into a vampire as a result of a failed medical experiment, and falls in love with Tae-ju (Kim Ok-bin), the wife of his childhood friend (Shin Ha-kyun).

An international co-production of South Korea and the United States, Thirst was released in South Korea on 30 April 2009, where it was a commercial success. It received generally positive reviews from critics and won the Jury Prize at the 2009 Cannes Film Festival, where it was also nominated for the Palme d'Or.

Plot
Sang-hyun is a Catholic priest who volunteers at the hospital, providing ministry to the patients. He is well respected for his unwavering faith and dedicated service, but he secretly suffers from feelings of doubt and sadness. Sang-hyun volunteers to participate in an experiment to find a vaccine for the deadly Emmanuel Virus (EV). Although the experiment fails, and Sang-hyun is infected with the seemingly fatal disease, he makes a complete and rapid recovery after receiving a blood transfusion.

News of his marvelous recovery quickly spreads among the devout parishioners of Sang-hyun's congregation, and they begin to believe that he has a miraculous gift for healing. Soon, thousands more flock to Sang-hyun's services. Among the new churchgoers are Kang-woo, Sang-hyun's childhood friend, and his family. Kang-woo invites his old friend to join the weekly mahjong night at his house, and there, Sang-hyun finds himself attracted to Kang-woo's wife, Tae-ju. Sang-hyun later relapses into his illness and wakes in dire need of shelter from the sunlight, having become a vampire.

At first, Sang-hyun feels a newfound vigor but soon he is aghast to find himself drinking blood from a comatose patient. After attempting to kill himself, Sang-hyun finds himself irresistibly drawn to human blood. To make matters worse, the symptoms of EV return and only seem to go away when he drinks blood. Desperately trying to avoid committing a murder, Sang-hyun resorts to stealing blood transfusion packs from the hospital.

Tae-ju, who lives with her ill husband and overprotective mother-in-law, Mrs. Ra, leads a dreary life. She is drawn to Sang-hyun and his physicality, and unable to resist odd desires for him. The two begin an affair, but when Tae-ju discovers the truth about Sang-hyun, she retreats in fear. When Sang-hyun pleads with her to run away with him, she turns him down, suggesting that they kill her husband instead.

When Sang-hyun's superior at the monastery requests some vampire blood so that his eyes may heal and he may see the world before dying, in disgust Sang-hyun flees from the monastery. He moves into Mrs. Ra's house so that he may secretly bed with Tae-ju. Sang-hyun notices bruises on Tae-ju and assumes her husband is the cause, a suspicion she sheepishly confirms. Sang-hyun decides to kill Kang-woo during a fishing trip with the couple. He pulls Kang-woo into the water and claims to his superior that he placed the body inside a cabinet in a house at the bottom of the lake, putting a rock on the body to keep it from floating to the surface. Sang-hyun's symptoms return so he kills his superior at the monastery and feeds on his blood.

A police investigation ensues. Mrs. Ra drinks often after her son's death, sinking psychosomatically into a completely paralyzed state. Sang-hyun and Tae-ju are haunted by terrifying visions of Kang-woo's bloated corpse. When Tae-ju lets slip that Kang-woo never abused her, Sang-hyun is enraged because he only killed Kang-woo to protect her. Teary-eyed, she asks Sang-hyun to kill her and let her return to her husband. He obliges by snapping her neck, but after feeding on her blood, decides he does not want to be alone forever and feeds her corpse his own blood. She awakens as a vampire. Mrs. Ra, knocked to the floor by a seizure, witnesses everything.

Tae-ju quickly shows herself to be a remorseless monster, killing indiscriminately to feed, while Sang-hyun acts more conservatively, only killing when necessary. Their conflicting ethics result in a chase across the rooftops and a short battle. Some time later, Mrs. Ra manages to communicate to Kang-woo's friends that Sang-hyun and Tae-ju killed her son. Tae-ju quickly disposes of two of the friends, and Sang-hyun appears to eliminate the third. Realizing the gravity of the situation, Sang-hyun tells Tae-ju that they must flee or be caught. Sang-hyun then places Mrs. Ra in his car, and with Tae-ju, drives into the night. Before leaving town, he makes a visit to the camp of worshipers who consider him the miracle EV survivor. He makes it seem like he tried to rape a girl, leading the campers to chase him away, no longer idolizing him.

Back at the house, the third friend escapes, whom Sang-hyun only pretended to kill to protect her from Tae-ju. Upon waking from a nap in the car, Tae-ju realizes that Sang-hyun has driven to a desolate field with no cover from the imminent dawn. Realizing his plan to have them both burn when dawn breaks, Tae-ju tries to hide but Sang-hyun foils her every attempt. Resigning herself to her fate, she joins him on the car hood, and both are burnt to ash by the sun, as Mrs. Ra watches from the backseat of the car.

Cast
 Song Kang-ho as Sang-hyun, a Catholic priest, who volunteers to be a patient of the "Emmanuel Virus," becoming a vampire after receiving blood from an unknown origin. He then struggles to deal with his newfound lust for blood.
 Kim Ok-bin as Tae-ju, a young wife of Sang-hyun's childhood friend, fed up with her mundane life while Sang-hyun develops a new love for her.
 Kim Hae-sook as Mrs. Ra, the overly protective mother of Kang-woo.
 Shin Ha-kyun as Kang-woo, Sang-hyun's sick childhood friend and Tae-ju's husband, whom he annoys and abuses according to her.
 Park In-hwan as Priest Roh, a blind priest superior to Sang-hyun, who wishes to see again.
 Song Young-chang as Seung-dae, a retired cop and Kang-woo's friend.
 Oh Dal-su as Young-du, another one of Kang-woo's friends.
 Ra Mi-ran as Nurse Yu
 Eriq Ebouaney as Emmanuel Research Director
 Hwang Woo-seul-hye as Whistle Girl
 Mercedes Cabral as Evelyn, Young-du's Filipino girlfriend.

Production

Thirst had been in the works for a number of years prior to the film's shooting and release. As early as Joint Security Area, director Park Chan-wook had asked Song Kang-ho to star in a vampire film Park was developing. Park further developed the film's story with co-writer Jeong Seo-kyeong while the two collaborated on Lady Vengeance and I'm a Cyborg, But That's OK.

Once greenlit, Thirst became the first Korean feature made with both Korean and U.S. studio funding and distribution, with CJ Entertainment and Focus Features partnering on the film's production. The film is also the first mainstream Korean film to feature full-frontal adult male nudity.

Reception

Thirst received generally favorable reviews from critics on its original release; review aggregator website Rotten Tomatoes reports an approval rating of 81% based on reviews from 114 critics, with an average rating of 6.83/10. The site's critics consensus reads, "The stylish Thirst packs plenty of bloody thrills to satisfy fans of both vampire films and director Chan Wook Park." At Metacritic, which assigns a normalized rating out of 100 to reviews from mainstream critics, the film has received an average score of 73 based on 21 reviews, indicating "generally favorable reviews".

Prominent film critic Roger Ebert awarded Thirst three out of a possible four stars, citing that the director was "today's most successful director of horror films." IGN's Joe Utichi awarded the film three-and-a-half out of five stars and said "Thirst may not be the greatest vampire movie ever made, but Park's willingness to try something different makes it a decidedly fresh take on the genre."

Box office
More than 2,223,429 tickets were sold nationwide becoming the 9th most attended film of 2009.

Awards and nominations
2009 Cannes Film Festival
 Jury Prize
 Nomination – Palme d'Or

2009 Chunsa Film Art Awards
 Best Director – Park Chan-wook
 Best Actor – Song Kang-ho
 Best Supporting Actress – Kim Hae-sook
 Best Lighting – Park Hyun-won

2009 Grand Bell Awards
 Best Lighting – Park Hyun-won
 Nomination – Best Supporting Actress – Kim Hae-sook

2009 Blue Dragon Film Awards
 Best Supporting Actress – Kim Hae-sook
 Best Music – Jo Yeong-wook
 Nomination – Best Film
 Nomination – Best Director – Park Chan-wook
 Nomination – Best Actor – Song Kang-ho
 Nomination – Best Actress – Kim Ok-bin
 Nomination – Best Supporting Actor – Shin Ha-kyun
 Nomination – Best Cinematography – Chung Chung-hoon
 Nomination – Best Art Direction – Ryu Seong-hee
 Nomination – Best Lighting – Park Hyun-won

2009 Director's Cut Awards
 Best Director – Park Chan-wook
 Best Actor – Song Kang-ho

2010 Asian Film Awards
 Best Visual Effects – Lee Seon-hyeong
 Nomination – Best Actor – Song Kang-ho
 Nomination – Best Cinematography – Chung Chung-hoon

2010 Baeksang Arts Awards
 Nomination – Best Film
 Nomination – Best Actress (Film) – Kim Ok-bin

Home media
Universal Studios Home Entertainment released a region 1 DVD of Thirst on 17 November 2009. No extras are included, but the film was produced in anamorphic widescreen with Korean DD5.1 Surround audio and subtitles in English, English SDH, French and Spanish. The director's cut, running 148 minutes, has been so far released in Korea only, on DVD and Blu-ray Disc.

See also
 List of South Korean films of 2009
 Nudity in film (East Asian cinema since 1929)

References

External links
 
 
 
 
 
 
 
 Interview with Writer/Director Park Chan-wook at The Korea Society

2009 films
2009 horror films
2009 thriller drama films
2000s horror thriller films
South Korean horror films
South Korean horror thriller films
South Korean erotic films
2000s Korean-language films
Films directed by Park Chan-wook
Adultery in films
Films about Catholic priests
Films about infectious diseases
Films based on French novels
Films based on works by Émile Zola
South Korean independent films
Religious horror films
Romantic horror films
Vampires in film
Focus Features films
CJ Entertainment films
2009 drama films
French-language Canadian films
2000s English-language films
2000s South Korean films